SunCoast Airlines was a U.S. charter airline based in Fort Lauderdale-Hollywood Airport, Florida.  It flew a fleet of Boeing 727-100s.  The airline filed for bankruptcy on January 5, 1988.

References

Defunct charter airlines of the United States
Airlines based in Florida
Defunct companies based in Florida
Companies that filed for Chapter 11 bankruptcy in 1988
Defunct airlines of the United States